Thomas Nelson Parker (September 28, 1898 – May 19, 1973) was an American politician. A native of Richmond, Virginia, he served on that city's city council, including two years as mayor, was chair of the Democratic Party of Virginia during the 1952 United States presidential election, and was Virginia Commissioner of Insurance from 1956 to 1969.

References

External links 

1898 births
1973 deaths
Mayors of Richmond, Virginia
University of Virginia School of Law alumni
Virginia Democrats
20th-century American lawyers
20th-century American politicians